The 2010 SCCA Pro Racing World Challenge was the 21st season of the SCCA Pro Racing World Challenge. It was the first season since 1998 without the sponsorship of television channel Speed.

The series returned to a combined-class race with GT, GTS, and TC racing simultaneously. The last season for combined classes was 1996, also the last year in which the series had more than two classes. There are three classes in the championship in 2010, as opposed to two in 2009. The top GT class remains the same, but the TC class has been changed to only allow more cost-effective racecars closer in spirit to the SCCA's improved touring classes.  The rules were originally introduced during the 2009 season as the TC2 class within the touring car category. The cars that previously competed in the old TC class can now be run in the new "GTS" class. The new format also solves the BMW-Acura-Mazda affair that had begun thirteen years prior and had lasted almost every year since save for some competition from Saturn and Audi in some years.

In addition to the existing driver's and manufacturer's championships, 2010 saw the introduction of a team's championship, which was awarded to the team car that accumulates the most points over the course of the season, regardless of the driver.

Due to Speed no longer supporting the series, Versus broadcast all events in ninety-minute broadcasts.

The new touring cars were now comparable to the vehicles used in the Continental Tire Sports Car Challenge.

Schedule
Most of the calendar was released in November 2009, with the season-ending round at Miller Motorsports Park added in January 2010.

Race results

Championships

Driver championships
Championship points are awarded to drivers based on qualifying and finishing positions.  In addition, 5 bonus points are awarded to a driver leading a lap during a race, and 5 bonus points are awarded to the driver leading the most laps.

GT standings

GTS standings

TC standings

Manufacturer championships
Manufacturer points are awarded according to the highest-finishing car from that manufacturer.  Only manufacturers that are SCCA Pro Racing corporate members receive points.  Points are awarded on the following basis:

In addition, one bonus point is awarded to the pole-winning manufacturer.  In the table below, the manufacturer's top finishing position is shown, with pole winner in bold.

GT standings

GTS standings

TC standings

References

External links
World Challenge Official Website

Scca Pro Racing World Challenge
GT World Challenge America